The Palace of the Condes de Cirat (Spanish: Palacio de los Condes de Cirat) is a palace located in Almansa, Spain. It was declared Bien de Interés Cultural in 1990.

References 

Palaces in Castilla–La Mancha
Bien de Interés Cultural landmarks in the Province of Albacete
Almansa